AC Merlan is a Togolese football club based in Lomé. They play in the top division in Togolese football. Their home stadium is Stade Oscar Anthony.

References

External links
Official site

Football clubs in Togo
Category:Football clubs in Lomé
Association football clubs established in 1974
1974 establishments in Togo